Xiao-Gang Wen (born November 26, 1961) is a Chinese-American physicist. He is a Cecil and Ida Green Professor of Physics at the Massachusetts Institute of Technology and Distinguished Visiting Research Chair at the Perimeter Institute for Theoretical Physics. His expertise is in condensed matter theory in strongly correlated electronic systems. In Oct. 2016, he was awarded the Oliver E. Buckley Condensed Matter Prize.

He is the author of a book in advanced quantum many-body theory entitled Quantum Field Theory of Many-body Systems: From the Origin of Sound to an Origin of Light and Electrons (Oxford University Press, 2004).

Early life and education
Wen attended the University of Science and Technology of China and earned a B.S. in Physics in 1982.

In 1982, Wen came to the US for graduate school via the CUSPEA program, which was organized by Prof. T. D. Lee. He attended Princeton University, from which be attained an M.A. in Physics in 1983 and a Ph.D in Physics in 1987.

Work
Wen studied superstring theory under theoretical physicist Edward Witten at Princeton University where he received his Ph.D. degree in 1987. He later switched his research field to condensed matter physics while working with theoretical physicists Robert Schrieffer, Frank Wilczek, Anthony Zee in Institute for Theoretical Physics, UC Santa Barbara
(1987–1989).

Wen introduced the notion of topological order (1989) and quantum order (2002), to describe a new class of matter states. This opens up a new research direction in condensed matter physics. He found that states with topological order contain non-trivial boundary excitations and developed chiral Luttinger theory for the boundary states (1990). The boundary states can become ideal conduction channel which may lead to device application of topological phases. He proposed the simplest topological order — Z2 topological order (1990), which turns out to be the topological order in the toric code. He also proposed a special class of topological order: non-Abelian quantum Hall states. They contain emergent particles with non-Abelian statistics which generalizes the well known Bose and Fermi statistics. Non-Abelian particles may allow us to perform fault tolerant quantum computations. With Michael Levin, he found that string-net condensations can give rise to a large class of topological orders (2005). In particular, string-net condensation provides a unified origin of photons, electrons, and other elementary particles (2003). It unifies two fundamental phenomena: gauge interactions and Fermi statistics. He pointed out that topological order is nothing but the pattern of long range entanglements. This led to a notion of symmetry protected topological (SPT) order (short-range entangled states with symmetry) and its description by group cohomology of the symmetry group (2011). The notion of SPT order generalizes the notion of topological insulator to interacting cases. He also proposed the SU(2) gauge theory of high temperature superconductors (1996).

Professional record

Professor, MIT, 2000–present 
Isaac Newton Research Chair, Perimeter Institute for Theoretical Physics, 2012–2014 
Associate professor, MIT, 1995—2000 
Assistant professor, MIT, 1991—1995 
Five-year member of IAS, 1989—1991 
Member of ITP, UC Santa Barbara, 1987—1989

Honors
A.P. Sloan Foundation fellow (1992)
Overseas Chinese Physics Association outstanding young researcher award (1994)
Changjiang professor, Center for Advanced Study, Tsinghua University (2000—2004) 
Fellow of American Physical Society (2002) 
Cecil and Ida Green Professor of Physics, MIT (2004—present) 
Distinguished Moore Scholar, Caltech (2006) 
Distinguished Research Chair, Perimeter Institute  (2009) 
Isaac Newton Chair, Perimeter Institute (announced Sep 2011)
2017 Oliver E. Buckley Condensed Matter Prize (announced Oct. 2016)
Member of National Academy of Sciences (2018)
2018 Dirac Medal of the ICTP

Selected publications

See also
Topological order
String-net
Topological entanglement entropy

References

External links
 http://dao.mit.edu/~wen
 http://physics.stackexchange.com/users/9444/xiao-gang-wen

1961 births
Living people
21st-century American physicists
Chinese emigrants to the United States
Massachusetts Institute of Technology School of Science faculty
Princeton University alumni
Theoretical physicists
University of Science and Technology of China alumni
Members of the United States National Academy of Sciences
Physicists from Shaanxi
People from Xi'an
Educators from Shaanxi
Sloan Research Fellows
Fellows of the American Physical Society
Oliver E. Buckley Condensed Matter Prize winners